The Day Is My Enemy is the sixth studio album by English electronic music group the Prodigy. It was released on 30 March 2015 by record labels Take Me to the Hospital/Cooking Vinyl in the UK and Three Six Zero Music/Warner Bros. Records in the United States.

Recorded across a timespan of six years, the album marks the first time that band members Maxim and Keith Flint have been actively involved in the songwriting process. The album title is a reference to the Cole Porter song "All Through the Night", in particular its lyrics "the day is my enemy, the night my friend", although it is the Ella Fitzgerald version that first inspired the title track.

Due to the band's general lack of interest in albums and the time spent in making them, The Day Is My Enemy was speculated to be their last full-length album, but then the band signed a worldwide record publishing deal with BMG Rights Management in September 2017, and released a follow-up album No Tourists, in 2018.

Recording

The first known existence of new material from the Prodigy came in 2011 when the band debuted new tracks at their live performances. The first two of these tracks were "A.W.O.L." and "Dogbite", with 2012 yielding a new track called "Jetfighter". Liam Howlett had reaffirmed that the new album would be "darker" in contrast to their previous releases. On 3 May 2012, the tentative album title was revealed as How to Steal a Jetfighter. On 2 July 2014, the Prodigy announced that the album was to be re-introduced with a brand new name.

The second working title of the album was Rebel Radio until it underwent another change. Howlett explained that this was because he had a hard time imagining it working as an album title, and instead settled on making that the title of one of the album tracks.

The album was written and recorded largely while on tour, in various hotel rooms around the world, on flights, at the Prodigy's private studio at Tileyard Studios as well as mixed at SARM. Howlett found that "violent is the word that keeps on coming up" when describing the album. The entire recording process took almost six years taking in a number of studios and a few restarts to establish that "angry, energetic sound". Unlike previous efforts The Day Is My Enemy became a band-album where Flint and Maxim worked in tandem with Howlett. This created a degree of friction although Flint noted that "four years ago we sat down and talked about where the next album was gonna go, and we knew we had to bust out the most ‘band’ album we could create".

Composition

The album's title track was the last track to be produced for the album. In an interview with BBC Radio 6 Music, Howlett mentioned that the idea of the track came about when one of his friends, Olly Burden, had presented Howlett with a guitar riff he had made, which would eventually serve as the main basis for the track. Howlett got an idea for a track and asked for the riff's use during the production, with him finding the results good enough to serve as an album opener. The track also includes additional drumming performance provided by the Switzerland-based drum corps, Top Secret Drum Corps.

The song "Ibiza" (featuring Sleaford Mods) is a critique of the superstar DJ culture. Howlett explained that "we did a gig in Ibiza, and I’m not a great fan of the place, but it isn’t an attack on the island, it’s an attack on these mindless fucking jokers that arrive in their Learjets, pull a USB stick out of their pockets, plug it in and wave their hands in the air to a pre-programmed mix".

Promotion and release 

On 26 January 2015 the band released the official audio for the title track "The Day Is My Enemy" on their official YouTube channel and as a digital downloadable promotional single. The official music video for the third single, "Wild Frontier", was released on 23 February 2015. The music video was directed by the Dutch filmmaker Mascha Halberstad and animator Elmer Kaan.

"Wall of Death" was released on 16 March 2015 as a promotional single, accompanied by a lyric video. UK retailer HMV announced during the week leading up to the album's release that they would stock an exclusive EP alongside the album which would mainly consist of remixes of "Nasty" and "Wild Frontier". "Ibiza" was released as the album's third official and fifth overall single on 23 March 2015, with "Rhythm Bomb" being released a promotional single on 25 March 2015. "Get Your Fight On" was released as a promotional single on 26 March 2015. The music video for "Ibiza" was uploaded to the Prodigy's YouTube channel on 20 April 2015.

During the evening of 3 April 2015, the band projected images of the album cover across several landmarks in London as a form of guerrilla marketing. The cover was projected onto the Battersea Power Station, the London Underground station at Shoreditch High Street and on the Houses of Parliament, with the projections garnering a relative amount of authority attention. The band posted photos and videos of the event on their Facebook and Instagram pages, with a hashtag that referenced the band's track "Their Law" from Music for the Jilted Generation.

The Day Is My Enemy was released on 30 March 2015 by record labels Take Me to the Hospital/Cooking Vinyl in the UK and Three Six Zero Music/Warner Bros. Records in the United States.

Reception

In contrast to their two previous albums, critical response to The Day Is My Enemy was positive. It currently has an aggregate score of 67 out of 100 on Metacritic, indicating generally favourable reviews.

Kerrang! awarded the album their highest rating, describing it as "simultaneously galvanised by both a thrilling creative resurgence and the social unrest that comes when people are cocooned by a culture of fear", and called it the most exciting and angrily British album of the year. NME thought of the tracks as being written mainly for live performances, but nonetheless cited it as "the strongest and most confident Prodigy album since The Fat of the Land". Consequence of Sound cited "Beyond the Deathray" as the highlight of the album, stating that it "epitomizes this new band-focused approach, and it's probably the most beautiful track in The Prodigy's discography".

AllMusic found that the band-focused approach benefited several tracks on the album, but overall criticised the general length of the album, finding that at 14 tracks it is "built for returning fan club members and not the EP-craving EDM crowd". In a more scathing review, Drowned in Sound echoed similar criticisms, claiming that the band "embraces their psycho circus shtick to the point of suffocation". Daryl Keating of Exclaim! was critical of the group's attempts at recapturing their old school breakbeat sound and "awful stylistic combinations", calling the record "an embarrassing display that inevitably ends badly".

The Day Is My Enemy debuted at No. 1 on the UK Albums Chart, making it the band's sixth consecutive record to have reached the top of the chart.

Track listing

Personnel 

The Prodigy
 Liam Howlett – production, writing, keyboards, synthesizers, sampling, programming, engineering, mixing; additional voices on "Wall of Death"
 Keith Flint – vocals on "Nasty", "Rebel Radio", "Ibiza", "Rok-Weiler", "Get Your Fight On", "Invisible Sun", "Wall of Death", writing on "Nasty", "Rok-Weiler", "Wall of Death"
 Maxim – vocals on "The Day Is My Enemy", "Nasty", "Rebel Radio", "Wild Frontier", "Roadblox", "Get Your Fight On", "Medicine", "Wall of Death", writing on "Roadblox" , "Get Your Fight On", "Medicine"

Additional personnel
 Neil McLellan – additional writing on "Beyond the Deathray", co-production (all), engineering (all), mixing (all)
 Martina Topley-Bird – additional vocals on "The Day Is My Enemy"
 Paul "Dirtcandy" Jackson – additional vocals on "The Day Is My Enemy"
 Top Secret Drum Corps – live drums on "The Day Is My Enemy"
 Simon "Brother Culture" Fajemisin – additional vocals on "Nasty" and "Rebel Radio", additional writing on "Rebel Radio"
 Tim Hutton – background vocals on "Nasty", "Rebel Radio", "Wild Frontier" and "Invisible Sun", and additional writing on "Nasty", "Rebel Radio", "Wild Frontier" and "Get Your Fight On"
 Black Futures (Stuart Henshall, Vincent Welch, Paul Frazer) – additional writing on "Rebel Radio" and "Rok-Weiler", co-production on "Rok-Weiler"
 Mark Summers – sample replay producer (at SCORCCiO Sample Replays) on "Rebel Radio", "Roadblox", "Medicine" and "Wall Of Death"
 Jason Williamson of Sleaford Mods – vocals and additional writing on "Ibiza"
 KillSonik (Joe Erskine & Luca Gulotta) – additional writing and production on "Wild Frontier" and "Get Your Fight On"
 Zak H Laycock – additional writing and production on "Destroy"
 Rob Holliday – guitar on "Rok-Weiler"
 Joshua "Flux Pavilion" Steele – co-writing and co-production on "Rhythm Bomb"
 Mark "YT" Hull – vocals and additional writing on "Medicine"
 Cole Porter – writing on "The Day Is My Enemy" (incorporating elements of his original song "All Through The Night")
 Olly Burden – additional writing on "The Day Is My Enemy" and "Wall of Death"
 Nick Halkes – additional writing on "Nasty", "Wild Frontier" and "Get Your Fight On"
 Cheri Williams of Jomanda – original female vocals and additional writing on "Rhythm Bomb" (sample taken from "Jomanda – Make My Body Rock 1990")
 Dwayne Richardson – additional writing on "Rhythm Bomb" (sample taken from "Jomanda – Make My Body Rock 1990")
 Jari Salo – additional writing on "Get Your Fight On" (sample taken from "Pepe Deluxé – Salami Fever")
 Paul Malmström – additional writing on "Get Your Fight On" (sample taken from "Pepe Deluxé – Salami Fever")
 Babaka & His Ensemble – original sample performer on "Medicine" (sample taken from Babaka & His Ensemble – "Se Makri Sofra / At a Long Table" as featured on the album "Music of the Balkans, Vol. 2")
 The Eighties Matchbox B-Line Disaster – writing on "Rise Of The Eagles"
 John Davis – mastering (at Metropolis Mastering)

Charts

Weekly charts

Year-end charts

Certifications

References

2015 albums
The Prodigy albums
Cooking Vinyl albums
Albums produced by Liam Howlett